Dead On: The Life and Cinema of George A. Romero is a 2008 documentary film directed by the filmmaker Rusty Nails. The film is about the life and career of the horror film director George A. Romero. Clips from his films are combined with interviews with Romero, his collaborators, and his admirers to show the whole story of his life. The film premiered at the 2008 Melbourne International Film Festival.

Synopsis
Nails' documentary, Dead On: The Life and Cinema of George A. Romero will go over Romero's body of film work as it stands to date. The film will also examine a number of aspects of George's work, working method, and association with the independent and Hollywood film communities. Among the interviewees are Dennis Hopper, Ed Harris, Stephen King, John Carpenter, Dario Argento, Danny Boyle, John Waters, Quentin Tarantino, Richard Linklater, Penn Jillette, Roger Ebert and Tom Savini. Dead On will investigate Romero's lifelong fascination with making films.

References

External links
 
 

2008 films
American documentary films
Documentary films about film directors and producers
2008 documentary films
Documentary films about horror
2000s English-language films
2000s American films